The 2020–21 season was  Orlando Pirates F.C.  25th season in the South African Premier Division, the highest division of South African football league system. Orlando Pirates F.C. participated in the MTN 8 Cup , CAF Confederation Cup and the Nedbank Cup.

Review and events

Orlando Pirates F.C. won the MTN 8 cup and finished 3rd in the 2020–21 DStv Premiership and Qualified for the 2021-22 CAF Confederation Cup following Kaizer Chiefs loss to Egyptian Club Al Ahly SC in the 2020-21 CAF Champions League final.
The team also reached the quarter-finals of the 2020-21 CAF Confederation Cup but were knocked out by Moroccan Club Raja Casablanca and eventual winners of the 2020-21 CAF Confederation Cup. In the Nedbank Cup , Orlando Pirates F.C. was knocked out by Mamelodi Sundowns F.C. The MTN 8 Triumph ended Orlando Pirates F.C. almost 6 year trophy drought since last winning a major cup in 2014 , by winning the 2013–14 Nedbank Cup.

Players

First team squad

Competitions

DStv Premiership

Orlando Pirates F.C. finished the season 3rd , and qualified for the 2021-22 CAF Confederation Cup .

MTN 8 Cup

Quarter-finals

Semi-finals

1st Leg

2nd Leg

Orlando Pirates won 5–0 on aggregate

Final

Luthuli scores his goal after a corner kick for Bloemfontein Celtic in the 4th minute. Orlando Pirates player Thabang Monare received an injury and was replaced by Thembinkosi lorch. In the 32nd minute, Hotto levels the matter for Orlando Pirates and the score was 1–1. After half time Thembinkosi lorch was fouled in the box and the referee called for a penalty in which was taken by lorch and made it 2–1 for Pirates scoring his second goal in the competition. The match ended in 2–1 and Pirates took the trophy ending their six-year trophy drought.

Nedbank Cup

Second round

Orlando Pirates F.C. entered the second Round as by competitions rules that
all 16 Premier Soccer League (PSL) clubs start the competition at the second round.

Orlando Pirates was drawn with National First Division (NFD) club Uthongathi F.C.

Third round

Quarter-finals

Orlando Pirates journey came to an end as they were eliminated by Mamelodi Sundowns.

International Competitions

CAF Confederation Cup
Orlando Pirates F.C. entered the 2020-21 CAF Confederation Cup first round , as they had 8pts  from the 2018-19 CAF Champions League run.

First round

Play-off round

Group stage
Orlando Pirates F.C. were drawn into group A , after securing a slot from the play-off round.

Group A
Orlando Pirates F.C. finished the group as Runners-up.

Quarter-finals
The first legs were played on 16 May, and the second legs were played on 23 May 2021.

Summary  
Orlando Pirates F.C. CAF Confederation Cup run came to an end after being eliminated by Moroccan Club Raja Casablanca.

Club awards

Orlando Pirates F.C. Season Awards :

Player of the Season - Deon Hotto and Vincent Pule (Tie)

Fan's player of the season - Deon Hotto and Vincent Pule (Tie)

Golden Boot Winner - Vincent Pule (9 goals in all competitions )

Prospect of the Season - Boitumelo Radiopane (MDC)

Goal of the Season - Vincent Pule on the turn vs Kaizer Chiefs F.C.

Save of the Season - Last minute save by Richard Ofori vs Bloemfontein Celtic F.C.

Notes

References 

Orlando Pirates F.C.
South African soccer clubs 2020–21 season